The ISBI Meteoro is an armored personnel carrier, built on the chassis of a General Motors truck called the Chevrolet Kodiak. It is currently used by the National Police, National Army and Colombian Naval Infantry in road safety plans on national highways, having been in use since 2004.

Operators

References

Vehicles introduced in 2004
All-wheel-drive vehicles
Armoured personnel carriers
Military vehicles introduced in the 2000s
Military equipment of Colombia